This is a list of Pontiac vehicles. Pontiac was a brand of automobiles manufactured and sold by General Motors (GM); though production ended in 2009, Pontiac remains a registered and active trademark of GM.

Past models

United States

International
Pontiac Acadian (1976–1987, rebadged Chevrolet Chevette/Pontiac T1000/1000, Canada)
Pontiac Astre (1975–1977; 1973–1977 Canada)
Pontiac Firefly (1985–2001, rebadged Chevrolet Sprint/Geo Metro/Suzuki Cultus, Canada)
Pontiac G2 (2006-2010 (Mexico only, and Mexico made), rebadged Chevy Spark after that in the US.
Pontiac G3 (2006–2009 (Mexico), rebadged Chevrolet Aveo/Daewoo Gentra)
Pontiac G4 (2005–2009, rebadged Chevrolet Cobalt, Mexico)
Pontiac G8 (2008–2009, rebadged Holden VE Commodore, Australia)
Pontiac Grande Parisienne (1966–1969, Canada)
Pontiac Laurentian (1955–1981, Canada)
Pontiac Matiz (1998–2005, rebadged Daewoo Matiz, Mexico)
Pontiac Matiz G2 (2006–2010, rebadged Daewoo Matiz, Mexico)
Pontiac Montana SV6 (2005–2006, continues in production for Canada and Mexico)
Pontiac Parisienne (1983–1986; 1958–1986, Canada)
Pontiac Pathfinder (1955–1958, Canada)
Pontiac Pursuit (later G5 Pursuit) (2005–2006, rebadged Chevrolet Cobalt, Canada)
Pontiac Strato-Chief (1955–1970, Canada)
Pontiac Sunburst (1985–1989, rebadged Chevrolet Spectrum/Isuzu Gemini, Canada)
Pontiac Sunrunner (1994–1997, rebadged Geo Tracker/Suzuki Escudo, Canada)
Pontiac Tempest (1987–1991, rebadged Chevrolet Corsica, Canada)
Pontiac Wave (later G3 Wave) (2004–2010, rebadged Chevrolet Aveo/Daewoo Gentra, Canada)

Concepts 
 Pontiac Banshee (1966, 1969, 1974, 1979, 1989) 
 Pontiac Bonneville Special (1954)
 Pontiac Bonneville Sport Convertible F/I 4 bucket seat cnvt (1958)
 Pontiac Bonneville X-400 (1959–1960)
 Pontiac Bonneville Le Grande Conchiche (1966)
 Pontiac Bonneville G/XP (2002)
 Pontiac Cirrus (1966)
 Pontiac Club de Mer (1956)
 Pontiac Fiero Convertible (1984)
 Pontiac Grand Prix X-400 (1962–1963)
 Pontiac Grand Prix SJ Edinburgh (1972)
 Pontiac Grand Prix Landau (1979)
 Pontiac Maharani (1963)
 Pontiac Montana Thunder (1998)
 Pontiac Monte Carlo (1962)
 Pontiac Proto Sport 4 (1991)
 Pontiac Piranha (2000)
 Pontiac Pursuit (1987)
 Pontiac Rageous (1997)
 Pontiac REV (2001)
 Pontiac Salsa (1992)
 Pontiac Sunfire (1990)
 Pontiac Sunfire Speedster (1994)
 Pontiac Stinger (1989)
 Pontiac Strato-Streak (1954)
 Pontiac Strato-Star (1955)
 Pontiac Tempest Fleur de Lis (1963)
 Pontiac Trans Am Type K (1978–1979)
 Pontiac Trans Sport (1986)
 Pontiac Q (2002)
 Pontiac GTO Ram Air 6 (2004)
 Pontiac El Camino (1987)
 Pontiac G6 (2003)

References
 

 
Pontiac